Harry Ritz (born Harry Joachim; May 22, 1907 – March 29, 1986), was an American comedian and actor. He was the youngest of the Ritz Brothers.

Early life

Ritz was born Harry Joachim on May 28, 1907, in Newark, New Jersey. He was born the youngest of six children to parents Max (December 1871 – January 4, 1939) and Pauline Joachim, (May 1874 – November 26, 1935). His father was born in Austria-Hungary and owned a haberdashery and his mother was born in Russia.

Ritz was the brother to fellow comedians (and future comedy partners), Al and Jimmy Ritz. He also had another brother named George who would become the future manager to the Ritz Brothers and had a sister named Gertrude Soll.

Career

By 1925, and after a full career on Broadway, he and brothers Al and Jimmy decided to team up and form a song/dance-and-comedy act called the Ritz Brothers. Al chose the name "Ritz"  after seeing it on the side of a laundry truck.  The brothers would have Harry standing in the middle singing "The Man in the Middle Is the Funny One", a song written for them. The other two brothers would then take to berating Harry for occupying that favored spot and, as they screamed their displeasure, Harry would wander about bellowing "Don't holler--please don't holler." Their comedy style was a tandem song and dance, as if they were one.

By 1930 they were playing the Palace where the headliner was Frank Fay with his bride, Barbara Stanwyck. By 1934, they had done their first film together as a team, Hotel Anchovy, all of 18 minutes long.

They worked in Shubert shows for a time and in 1932 caught the attention of Earl Carroll who featured them in his Vanities that year. They were appearing at the old Clover Club on Hollywood's Sunset Strip when Darryl F. Zanuck reportedly caught the act and signed them to a contract. (Al had appeared earlier in a silent film, The Avenging Trail in 1918.)

The Ritz Brothers started their Hollywood film career with 20th Century Fox in 1936, starring with Alice Faye in Sing, Baby, Sing. Later they were in One in a Million with Sonja Henie, The Three Musketeers with Don Ameche, Kentucky Moonshine and The Goldwyn Follies.

The brothers left Fox in 1940 and went with rival studio Universal. The brothers quit after filming the movie "Never a Dull Moment" in 1943 to concentrate on club dates. The Ritzes, among the first of the big-money acts in Las Vegas, made a few television specials in the early 1950s. They carried their zaniness on the road until 1965 when Al died in New Orleans where they were performing. Harry and Jimmy stayed together and by 1966 opened the new Caesars Palace in Las Vegas.  They continued to perform, just the two of them, in Florida and upstate New York theaters, cruise ships,  as well as some guest appearances on the Dick Cavett Show, Merv Griffin, etc.  By the 1970s and 1980s, they had small roles in films such as Blazing Stewardesses (1975) and Won Ton Ton, the Dog Who Saved Hollywood (1976). Harry also appeared in a cameo in the 1976 Mel Brooks film Silent Movie.

Personal life
Harry was married four times. He had 7 children (with three different mothers).

Death and legacy

In his last years, Ritz battled with cancer, and Alzheimer's disease, but Ritz died of pneumonia on March 29, 1986. He left behind a widow, his children (including two young daughters with a very young wife), granddaughter and his sister. Ritz is buried at the Hollywood Forever Cemetery in Los Angeles.

Ritz, along with his brothers, influenced comedians such as Jerry Lewis, Sid Caesar, Mel Brooks, and Danny Kaye. Brooks cast Ritz in a cameo in his 1976 movie Silent Movie. In an interview with Esquire magazine, Brooks had this to say regarding Ritz;

In that same interview, Lewis had this to say about Ritz;

Filmography

References

External links

1907 births
1986 deaths
American male comedians
20th-century American comedians
American male film actors
Jewish American comedians
Jewish American male actors
Male actors from Newark, New Jersey
American male comedy actors
Deaths from pneumonia in California
20th-century American male actors
Vaudeville performers
Burials at Hollywood Forever Cemetery
Jewish American male comedians
20th-century American Jews